Stormhorse is the second album by In the Nursery, released in 1987 through Sweatbox Records.

Track listing

Personnel 
In the Nursery
Klive Humberstone – instruments, vocals
Nigel Humberstone – instruments, vocals
Q. – percussion
Dolores Marguerite C – narration
Production and additional personnel
Chris Bigg – design
Jane Cornthwaite – cello on "Miracle of the Rose II"
In the Nursery – production
Sebastiane – production
Bill Stephenson – photography

References

External links 
 

1987 albums
In the Nursery albums